S-specific spore photoproduct lyase (SAM, SP lyase, SPL, SplB, SplG) is an enzyme with systematic name S-specific spore photoproduct pyrimidine-lyase. This enzyme catalyses the following chemical reaction

 (5S)-5,6-dihydro-5-(thymidin-7-yl)thymidine (in DNA) + S-adenosyl-L-methionine  thymidylyl-(3'->5')-thymidylate (in DNA) + 5'-deoxyadenosine + L-methionine

This enzyme is an iron-sulfur protein.

References

External links 
 

EC 4.1.99